The World Sportscar Championship was the world series run for sports car racing by the FIA from 1953 to 1992.

The championship evolved from a small collection of the most important sportscar, endurance, and road racing events in Europe and North America with dozens of gentleman drivers at the grid, to a professional racing series where the world's largest automakers spent millions of dollars per year. The official name of the series changed throughout the years, however it has generally been known as the World Sportscar Championship from its inception in 1953.  The World Sportscar Championship was, with the Formula One World Championship, one of the two major world championships in circuit motor racing.

In 2012 the World Sportscar Championship was revived and renamed as the World Endurance Championship.

Races 
The most famous event was the 24 Hours of Le Mans which was the part of the championship in every season except of the 1956, 1975–79 and 1989–90 seasons.

The 24 Hours of Daytona followed near-continuous inclusion on the World Sportscar Championship. In 1982, the race was dropped as the series attempted to cut costs by both keeping teams in Europe and running shorter race.

Among others, the following races also counted towards the championships in certain years:
Mille Miglia 1953–57
1000 km Nürburgring 1953–
RAC Tourist Trophy 1953–64
12 Hours of Sebring 1953–
Carrera Panamericana 1953–54
Targa Florio 1955–73
1000 km Monza 1963–2008
1000 km Spa 1963–
12 Hours of Reims 1964–65
1000 km Buenos Aires 1954–72
1000 km Zeltweg 1966–76
1000 km Fuji 1983–88
Norisring 200 Miles 1984–88
Watkins Glen 6 Hours 1968–71, 1973–80

History

1953 to 1961 
In the early years, now legendary races such as the Mille Miglia, Carrera Panamericana and Targa Florio were part of the calendar, alongside the 24 Hours of Le Mans, the 12 Hours of Sebring, the Tourist Trophy and Nurburgring 1000 km. Manufacturers such as Ferrari, Maserati, Mercedes-Benz, Porsche, and Aston Martin fielded entries, often featuring professional racing drivers with experience in Formula One, but the majority of the fields were made up of gentleman drivers (privateers) in the likes of Nardis and Bandinis. Cars were split into Sports Car and GT (production car) categories and were further divided into engine displacement classes. The Ferrari and Maserati works teams were fierce competitors throughout much of the decade, but although Maserati cars won many races the make never managed to clinch the World title. The Mercedes-Benz work team pulled out of the championship after 1955 due to their crash at Le Mans, while the small Aston Martin factory team struggled to find success in 1957 and 1958 until it managed to win the championship in 1959. Notably absent from the overall results were the Jaguar works team, who did not enter any events other than Le Mans, despite the potential of the C- and D-Types.

1962 to 1965

In 1962, the calendar was expanded to include smaller races, while the FIA shifted the focus to production based GT cars. The World Sportscar Championship title was discontinued, being replaced by the International Championship for GT Manufacturers. They group cars into three categories with specific engine sizes; less than one litre, less than two litres, and over two litres. Hillclimbs, sprint races and smaller races expanded the championship, which now had about 15 races per season. The famous races like Le Mans still counted towards the prototype championship, however, the points valuation wasn't very tabular so the FIA returned to the original form of the championship with about 6 to 10 races.

For 1963 the three engine capacity classes remained but a prototype category was added. For 1965 the engine classes became for cars under 1300 cc (Class I), under 2000 cc (Class II), and over 2000 cc (Class III). Class III was designed to attract more American manufacturers, with no upper limit on engine displacement.

1966 to 1981 

The period between 1966 and 1971 was possibly the most successful era of the World Championship, with S (5 L sports cars ) and P (3 L prototypes) classes, and cars such as the Ferrari 512S, Ferrari 330 P4, Ford GT40, Lola T70, Chaparral, Alfa Romeo 33, and Porsche's 908, 917 battled for supremacy on classic circuits such as Sebring, Nürburgring, Spa-Francorchamps, Monza, Targa Florio, and Le Mans where the Ford's won four years in a row, in what is now considered the Golden Age of sports car racing.

In 1972 the Group 6 Prototype and Group 5 Sports Car classes were both replaced by a new Group 5 Sports Car class. These cars were limited to 3.0 L engines by the FIA, and manufacturers gradually lost interest. The new Group 5 Sports Cars, together with Group 4 Grand Touring Cars, would contest the FIA's newly renamed World Championship for Makes from 1972 to 1975. From 1976 to 1981 the World Championship for Makes was open to Group 5 Special Production Cars and other production based categories including Group 4 Grand Touring cars and it was during this period that the nearly-invincible Porsche 935 dominated the championship. Prototypes returned in 1976 as Group 6 cars with their own series, the World Championship for Sports Cars, but this was to last only for two seasons (1976–1977). In 1981, the FIA instituted a drivers championship.

1982 to 1992 

In 1982, the FIA attempted to counter a worrying climb in engine output of the Group 5 Special Production Cars by introducing Group C, a new category for closed sports-prototypes (purpose built racing cars) that limited fuel consumption (the theory being that by limiting fuel consumption, engine regulations could be more relaxed).  While this change was unwelcome amongst some of the private teams, manufacturer support for the new regulations was immense. Several of the 'old guard' manufacturers returned to the WSC within the next two years, with each marque adding to the diversity of the series.  Under the new rules, it was theoretically possible for normally aspirated engines to compete with the (expensive to maintain) forced induction engines that had dominated the series in the '70s and early '80s. In addition, most races ran for either 500 or 1000 km, usually going over three and six hours, respectively, so it was possible to emphasize the "endurance" aspect of the competition as well. Group B cars, which was a GT class, were also allowed to race, but entries in this class were sparse; combined with fatal accidents in rallying where the Group B class saw more popularity, the class (and European GT racing altogether) disappeared from the series, with sports-prototypes dominating the championship.

Porsche was the first constructor to join the series, with the 956, but soon several other makes joined the series, including Jaguar Cars, Mercedes-Benz, Nissan, Toyota, Mazda and Aston Martin.  As costs increased, a C2 class (originally named C Junior) was created for privateer teams and small manufacturers, with greater limits to fuel consumption. In this lower class, most cars used either the BMW M1 engine or the new Cosworth DFL, but, like in the main class, a variety of solutions were employed by each individual manufacturer. Alba, Tiga, Spice and Ecurie Ecosse were among the most competitive in this class.  While the Group C formula had brought manufacturers back to the sport, it was again Porsche - with its 956 & 962 Group C line - that continued their domination of the sport.

For 1986, the World Endurance Championship became the World Sports-Prototype Championship.

Although the Group C formula was a success, with regular crowds of 50,000 to 70,000 at WSC events (a modern Grand Prix in Europe will have similar crowds), and upwards of 350,000 at the 24 hours of Le Mans, the FIA introduced new rules for 1991 at the behest of FIA vice president Bernie Ecclestone; 750 kg machines with contemporary normally aspirated engines, which were purpose-built 3500cc racing units.  The new classification, known as Group C Category 1, was designed to mandate Formula One engines. Although power was generally less than existing Group C cars (around 650 bhp compared to around 750 bhp upwards) the new cars are considered to be among the quickest sportscars ever. However, the take up of these new regulations was slow and only a handful of Category 1 cars were ready for the 1991 season. Consequently, the FIA also allowed cars complying with pre-1991 Group C rules to contest the championship (as Group C Category 2 cars) during the one transitional year. They were however seriously handicapped in terms of weight, fuel allocation and grid positions. For 1991 the championship took on yet another new name, the FIA Sportscar World Championship and the new 3.5 litre rules took full effect for the 1992 championship with the old Group C cars no longer included.

1993 demise
The new generation of WSC racing engines, with the stated intent of cost reduction and improved competition, quickly proved highly suspect. Costs rose massively as works teams developed cars capable of qualifying around halfway up a Formula 1 grid, despite weighing some 200 kg more. Manufacturers again abandoned the sportscar series, realising they now had an engine suitable for F1. In particular, Mercedes and Peugeot elected to either concentrate on or move solely to F1. The more exotic engines were unaffordable for teams like Spice and ADA, thus after the manufacturers left the top class of sportscar racing, the series essentially collapsed. A lack of entries meant the 1993 season was cancelled before the first race.

In 1994, the World Sportscar title would return, this time in the hands of the International Motor Sports Association in North America for use in the IMSA GT series.  The name would be used for the series' top class of prototypes until 1998 when the series ended.

In addition, 1994 also signaled the return of an international GT series after an absence of over a decade with the introduction of the BPR Global GT Series. The success of the series lead to a friendly takeover by the FIA in 1997, becoming the FIA GT Championship. Prototypes were mainly absent from European tracks (Le Mans being the sole notable exception) until 1997, which saw the creation of the International Sports Racing Series which evolved into the short-lived FIA Sportscar Championship in 2001 until 2003.  Sports prototypes then came exclusively under the control of the Automobile Club de l'Ouest (ACO) and their sanctioned series, the American Le Mans Series in North America and the Le Mans Series in Europe.  The FIA's championship for GTs was eventually promoted to world championship status in 2010, while the ACO launched their own international championship, the Intercontinental Le Mans Cup, the same year.

2012 return

Following the success of the ACO's Intercontinental Le Mans Cup (ILMC), the FIA reached an agreement with the ACO to create a new FIA World Endurance Championship for 2012.  The series shares many elements of the ILMC, including the use of the 24 Hours of Le Mans as part of the series schedule.  The series continues to utilize the ACO's two primary classes, Le Mans Prototypes and GT Endurance (GTE).  Championship titles are awarded for constructors and drivers in prototypes, while a constructors cup are awarded in the GTE categories. From 2017 championship titles are awarded also for constructors and drivers in GTE category.

Championship winners 

Note: In 1953-1984 seasons titles were awarded to manufacturers of sports cars belonging to two main categories: Sports prototype (except of the 1978-1981 seasons) and Grand Touring (GT) (except of the 1953-1961 and 1982 seasons). In   1985-1992 seasons titles were awarded only to teams entering sports prototypes (instead of manufacturers of sports prototypes), excluding teams entering GT cars.

See also
 FIA World Endurance Championship

References

External links
WSC Results
World Sportscar Championship stats

 
Group C
Defunct auto racing series
Recurring sporting events established in 1953
Recurring sporting events disestablished in 1992